The North East Derbyshire Music Centre, or NEDMC is a music organisation located in Derbyshire.  It provides ensemble-based music opportunities for both beginners and experienced musicians. Groups meet at Outwood Academy Newbold, Newbold on Friday nights and Saturday mornings during school term time.

External links 
 

Chesterfield, Derbyshire